Arjuna Natural Extracts Ltd. is an Indian firm focused on the production of plant based active compounds. The company has its headquarters in Aluva. It is one of India's leading company specializing in extraction of plant compounds.  

It was established in 1990. It was founded by P.J. Kunjachan along with his brother-in-law, Dr. Benny Antony.

History 
Arjuna Natural Extract was founded in 1990 with an initial investment of 3 lakh. They began their journey by manufacturing mustard oil. In the first year they made a turnover of Rs 70 lakh with a profit of Rs 45 lakh. The company found success in separating omega-3 fatty acids from sardine oil. ANEL later shifted its focus to research after it found that competition was stiff in the spice extract exports.. The company obtained patents for BCM-95 in 2005.

The company appointed Anup Krishnan as its CEO in 2022 to head its planned manufacturing capacity expansion.

Arjuna Natural has been engaged in manufacturing of spice and botanical extracts for food supplements.

Operations 
The company mainly manufactures BCM 95, which is a patented formulation of curcumin, besides turmeric extracts, the company also manufactures extracts developed from amla, green tea, pomegranate, ginger, Omega 3 fatty acid from fish oils, red spinach and mustard. It has a R&D centre in Aluva and two manufacturing facility in Coimbatore and Kochi. Arjuna Natural Extracts also has a sister company Curegarden, a natural health supplements brand.

References

External links 
 

Chemical companies of India
Companies based in Kerala
Manufacturing companies of India
Companies based in Kochi
Chemical companies established in 1990